Tom McInerney (1905–1998) was an Irish sportsperson.  He played hurling with his local club O'Callaghan's Mills and with the Clare senior inter-county team from 1927 until 1936.

Playing career

Club

McInerney played club hurling with his local club O'Callaghan's Mills and enjoyed some success.  He won a senior county title with the club in 1937.  McInerney was the brother of Pa (Fowler) McInerney, also of O'Callahan's Mills, who won All-Ireland hurling championships with Clare and Dublin in the early 20th century.

Inter-county

McInerney first came to prominence for the Clare senior inter-county team in 1927 when Clare reached the Munster final.  Cork opposed him on that occasion and went on to win the game by 5-3 to 3-4.

In 1928, Clare took on Cork for the second consecutive year in the Munster final.  That year, McInerney's side nearly pulled off a shock result, however, both sides finished level after recording 2-2.  The replay was not a happy game for Clare as Cork trounced them by 6-4 to 2-2.

Two years later, in 1930, McInerney was back in the provincial decider.  Tipperary were the opponents on that occasion; however, Clare failed to make the breakthrough once again.  A score line of 6-4 to 2-8 gave victory to Tipp.

In 1932, Clare reached the Munster final for the fourth time in six years.  Once again, Cork, a team that had defeated McInerney's side on many occasions, provided the opposition.  The game saw Clare triumph for the first time since 1914.  A score line of 5-2 to 4-1 gave McInerney his first and only Munster medal.  The subsequent All-Ireland semi-final ended with Clare emerging victorious over Galway by 9-4 to 4-14.  This victory allowed Clare to advance to the All-Ireland final where Kilkenny provided the opposition.  In a low-scoring but tense game, Clare’s Tull Considine scored two goals and was foiled for what would almost certainly have been a third.  These goals were negated by Kilkenny’s three goal-scoring heroes Matty Power, Martin White and Lory Meagher.  The final score of 3-3 to 2-3 gave victory to Kilkenny.

Clare went into decline following this game, as Limerick emerged as the dominant force in Munster.  McInenrey retired from inter-county hurling in 1936.

1905 births
1998 deaths
Irish schoolteachers
O'Callaghan's Mills hurlers
Clare inter-county hurlers